Old Arley is a village in the civil parish of Arley, in the north of Warwickshire, England,  west of Nuneaton and  north west of the city of Coventry.

Location 
The village is within the civil parish of Arley in the North Warwickshire district of Warwickshire of which it is the less populated settlement. It is to the west of the stream called Bourne Brook and the Birmingham to Peterborough Line. The other settlement within the parish is New Arley which is southeast. The locality of New Arley known as Hill Top is higher still at 166 m (545 ft), the highest point of the parish.

Closest towns and transport
The B4114 runs along gentle hillsides east–west to the north of the village and travels west  to meet the motorway network by the village of Coleshill on the nearside of Spaghetti Junction providing there a direct route over that junction to Birmingham or a short stretch (of the A446 road) south to Junction 4 of the M6 for longer distance journeys.

History 
Old Arley is included in the Domesday Book which was compiled in 1086. In its entry there the village, which is named as Arei, has four households, 2 men's plough teams, Woodland of 1.5 by 1 leagues. In 1066 the lord of the manor was Earl Edwin, and in 1086 the manor was Princess Christina who was also listed as the Tenant-in-chief. The parish had a taxable value of 1 gold unit per year. The village and parish was foremost a farming community and had several hamlets within its parish which combined slowly into the village of Old Arley: Gun Hill, Slowley Hill, Devitt's Green and Ballard's Green. The village was centred on the gothic, stone-built parish church of St Wilfrid. Samuel Lewis described the village in 1848:

In 1881 the population of the village was 207 and by 1891 it had risen to 216. In 1900 the Kelly's Directory includes a post office, with a post box built into the wall, which was said to be by the church. There was also a mixed free school which had been opened in 1875 for an attendance of a capacity of sixty, but had only an average attendance of thirty-three pupils. There was also a railway station with station master Alfred Lingdon. Kelly's also lists a total of twenty farms, one water mill and one public house, the Wagon Load of Lime. There was also one shop. The parish church of Old Arley is called Saint Wilfred and there is a Methodist church in the village.

References

Villages in Warwickshire
Borough of North Warwickshire